"Soothe My Soul" is a song by English electronic music band Depeche Mode from their thirteenth studio album, Delta Machine (2013). It was released as the album's second single on 10 May 2013 in Germany, 13 May internationally, 14 May in North America, and 10 June in the United Kingdom. The music video was directed by Warren Fu and premiered on 28 March 2013.

Track listings
Digital download – remix 
"Soothe My Soul" (Steve Angello vs. Jacques Lu Cont remix) – 7:02

CD single
"Soothe My Soul" (radio edit) – 3:57
"Goodbye" (Gesaffelstein remix) – 3:51

CD maxi single
"Soothe My Soul" (Steve Angello vs. Jacques Lu Cont remix) – 7:02
"Soothe My Soul" (Tom Furse - The Horrors remix) – 4:55
"Soothe My Soul" (Billy F Gibbons and Joe Hardy remix) – 5:16
"Soothe My Soul" (Joris Delacroix remix) – 6:56
"Soothe My Soul" (Black Asteroid remix) – 5:35
"Soothe My Soul" (Gregor Tresher Soothed remix) – 5:59

12-inch single
A1. "Soothe My Soul" (Steve Angello vs Jacques Lu Cont Remix)
A2. "Soothe My Soul" (Matador Remix) – 8:15
B1. "Soothe My Soul" (Destructo Remix) – 6:03
B2. "Soothe My Soul" (Gregor Tresher Remix) – 7:07

Charts

Release history

References

External links
 Single information from the official Depeche Mode web site
 AllMusic review

2013 singles
2013 songs
Columbia Records singles
Depeche Mode songs
Number-one singles in Hungary
Song recordings produced by Ben Hillier
Songs written by Martin Gore
Black-and-white music videos
Music videos directed by Warren Fu